Ellis Paxson Oberholtzer (born Cambria Station, Chester County, Pennsylvania, October 5, 1868; died December 8, 1936, Philadelphia, age 68) was an American biographer and historical writer.

Biography
He was the son of John Oberholtzer, a former schoolteacher who during Ellis' lifetime ran Willowdale Mills (now The Mill at Anselma in Chester Springs, Pennsylvania) and later became a successful grain merchant.  Ellis' mother, Sara Louisa Vickers Oberholtzer, was a respected poet and social activist known for her work in abolition, post-Civil War social reform, and equal rights.  Ellis had one brother named Vickers Oberholtzer.

Ellis was educated at the University of Pennsylvania (Ph. D., 1893), at German universities (Berlin and Heidelberg), and in Paris.  He was on the editorial staff of the Philadelphia Evening Telegraph (1889–96), editor of The Manufacturer (1896-1900), and literary and dramatic editor of the Philadelphia Public Ledger (1902–08).  He edited the American Crisis Biographies (20 volumes) and in 1908 and 1912 directed historical pageants at Philadelphia. His wife, Winona McBride Oberholtzer, was the sister of publisher Robert M. McBride.

He died in 1936 and was interred at West Laurel Hill Cemetery in Bala Cynwyd, Pennsylvania.

Works
The Referendum in America (1893; new edition, 1900; 3rd ed., 1908; revised, 1911)
Die Beziehungen zwischen dem Staat und der Zeitungspresse im deutschen Reich (1895)
 The New Man (1897)
 Robert Morris, Patriot and Financier (1903)
Abraham Lincoln (1904)
The Literary History of Philadelphia (1906)

Henry Clay (1909), with T. H. Clay
Philadelphia: A History of the City and its People (four volumes, 1912).
A History of the United States since the Civil War (1917).
The Morals of the Movie (1922).

Notes

References

 Website of The Mill at Anselma
 
 

University of Pennsylvania alumni
Writers from Philadelphia
1868 births
1936 deaths
Burials at West Laurel Hill Cemetery
People from Chester County, Pennsylvania
19th-century American historians
20th-century American historians
20th-century American biographers
Humboldt University of Berlin alumni
Heidelberg University alumni
19th-century American male writers
20th-century American male writers
American male non-fiction writers